Cosmin Aurelian Olăroiu (born 10 June 1969) is a Romanian professional football manager and former footballer in charge of UAE Pro League Sharjah FC.
As a manager, he guided Steaua Bucharest to the Romanian League title and Romanian Supercup both in 2006, and led his side to the semi-finals of the UEFA Cup in the same year. He is considered one of the greatest managers in the Arabian Peninsula, having led the most decorated clubs of Saudi Arabia, Qatar and United Arab Emirates – Al Hilal, Al Sadd, Al Ain and Al Ahli – to new trophies. In 2020, he guided Jiangsu Suning to their first-ever title in China.

Club career
As a player, Olăroiu's best-known clubs he played for are Universitatea Craiova and Naţional București. However, he also played with success in K League for Suwon Samsung Bluewings where he helped the club to win two K League titles in 1998 and 1999. He also won the Korean League Cup and twice the Super Cup. He finished his playing career with JEF United Ichihara in 2000.

Coaching career

Early years
He started his coaching career during the 2000–01 season at Naţional București, leading them to a respectable 7th place in his first season. During the following season, he guided the club to a second-place finish in the league, finishing above clubs such as Steaua and Rapid București.

In the summer 2002, Olăroiu signed for Steaua București. He resigned after only seven league games, blaming the decision on a lack of support from the board and players. The club president Viorel Păunescu re-appointed Victor Piţurcă, former manager before 2002 who wanted to return to head-coaching and was still highly regarded by the players.

After leaving Steaua București, Olăroiu returned to Național București, this time as a general manager. In 2003, he was named head coach again, replacing Walter Zenga.

In the winter of 2004, Olăroiu joined Politehnica Timişoara and brought with him the best players from Național București. He led them to a near historical fourth-place finish in Divizia A, but in November 2005 he was sacked by the club's owner Marian Iancu.

Steaua Bucharest
Just some days after, Olăroiu was appointed manager by Gigi Becali, the new president, and this time owner, of Steaua București, to replace Oleh Protasov. His first championship title as coach came in June 2006 and then one month later, he led the club to the conquest of the Supercupa României. In May 2006, Olăroiu's side reached the semi-finals of the 2005–06 UEFA Cup. He also helped Steaua to qualify for the UEFA Champions League group stages, where they played against Dinamo Kiev, Real Madrid and Olympique Lyon. Steaua secured a third place and a spot in the UEFA Cup knockout rounds.

Al-Hilal

In June 2007, Olăroiu signed for Al-Hilal. In 2008, he again proved his coaching worth, winning the Saudi Premier League and the Crown Prince Cup in his first season in charge. He led his side to a second Crown Prince Cup title before leaving the club in February 2009, while leading them to the first position in the league.

Al-Sadd
In April 2009, he signed a two-year contract with Al-Sadd. In December 2010, Olăroiu announced his resignation as club boss immediately after leading his side to the Qatari Stars Cup.

On 5 May 2011, Olăroiu was named supervisor for Steaua București for the last three matches of Liga I in the 2010–11 season and the 2011 Cupa României Final. Steaua's assistant coach, Gabriel Caramarin took charge of the team as caretaker manager, for the last remaining games.

Al Ain
In the summer of 2011, Cosmin Olăroiu was hired as Al Ain manager on a two-year contract. He steered the club away from the relegation zone, before leading them to the UAE Pro-League title in the 2011–12 season. On 18 September 2012, he also won the UAE Super Cup with Al Ain.

He then repeated the performance the following season, winning a consecutive title for Al Ain. In June 2013, Olăroiu signed a contract extension with Al Ain reportedly worth €4 million a season after penning new two-year deal. However, the contract was terminated on 1 July 2013.

Al Ahli
On 6 July 2013, it was announced that Olăroiu signed a three-year contract with Dubai side Al Ahli. On 30 August, Olăroiu won his first match in charge of Al Ahli against his former club Al Ain in the Super Cup final. In April 2014, Cosmin Olăroiu mathematically won his third consecutive league title as Al Ahli won over arch rivals Al Wasl 2–1. During his first season in charge, Olăroiu won three domestic titles and was awarded as Coach of the Year by the Arabian Gulf League in 2014.

He guided the club to their first AFC Champions League final in 2015, losing 1–0 on aggregate to China's Guangzhou Evergrande.

In the 2016–17 season, Olăroiu became one of the highest paid managers in world football, earning a sum of €6.5 million annually.

Saudi Arabia
On 15 December 2014, it was announced that he will train the Saudi Arabia national football team for 2015 AFC Asian Cup as temporary coach. His first match in charge was a 4–1 loss to Bahrain in a friendly match. Olăroiu's side also lost two next matches, including a 1–0 loss to China in 2015 AFC Asian Cup in Saudi Arabia's first match at the tournament. They won their next match 4–1 against North Korea but lost 3–1 their final match against Uzbekistan and were eliminated in the group stages. The results is a consequence of his not knowing his players well, having only been appointed in a hurriedly temporary agreement. At the end of the tournament, Olăroiu returned to his club position.

Jiangsu Suning
On 28 March 2018, Olăroiu was appointed at Jiangsu Suning in the Chinese Super League, replacing Fabio Capello. He took charge of his first match on 1 April in a home game against Tianjin Teda, which Jiangsu won 2–1.

In his third season, Jiangsu Suning won the Super League title for the first time in the club's history. However, the club folded before the start of 2021 season.

Sharjah
On 10 November 2021, Olăroiu returned to the United Arab Emirates to help an out of form Sharjah stay competitive in the UAE Pro League.

Honours

Player
Suwon Samsung Bluewings
K League: 1998, 1999
Korean League Cup: 1999, 2000
Korean Super Cup:  1999, 2000
Daehan Fire Insurance Cup: 1999
Asian Cup Winners' Cup Runner-up: 1997–98

Manager
Steaua Bucharest
Romanian League: 2005–06
Romanian Supercup: 2006
 
Al Hilal
Saudi League: 2007–08
Saudi Crown Prince Cup: 2007–08, 2008–09

Al Sadd
Qatari Stars Cup: 2010

Al Ain
UAE League: 2011–12, 2012–13
UAE Super Cup: 2012

Shabab Al Ahli
UAE League: 2013–14, 2015–16
UAE League Cup: 2013–14, 2016–17
UAE Super Cup: 2013, 2014, 2016
AFC Champions League runner-up: 2015

Jiangsu Suning
Chinese Super League: 2020

Sharjah FC
UAE President's Cup: 2021–22
UAE Super Cup: 2022

Individual
 Romania Coach of the Year: 2006, 2020
 AGL Coach of the Year: 2014, 2016, 2017
 Ahdaaf Middle East Coach of the Year: 2015

References

External links

1969 births
Living people
Footballers from Bucharest
Romanian footballers
Association football central defenders
FC Gloria Buzău players
FC Progresul București players
FC U Craiova 1948 players
Suwon Samsung Bluewings players
JEF United Chiba players
Liga I players
K League 1 players
J1 League players
Romanian expatriate footballers
Romanian expatriate sportspeople in South Korea
Romanian expatriate sportspeople in Japan
Expatriate footballers in South Korea
Expatriate footballers in Japan
Romanian football managers
FC Progresul București managers
FC Steaua București managers
FC Politehnica Timișoara managers
Al Hilal SFC managers
Al Sadd SC managers
Al Ain FC managers
Al Ahli Club (Dubai) managers
Saudi Arabia national football team managers
Jiangsu F.C. managers
Saudi Professional League managers
Qatar Stars League managers
UAE Pro League managers
Chinese Super League managers
2015 AFC Asian Cup managers
Romanian expatriate football managers
Romanian expatriate sportspeople in Saudi Arabia
Romanian expatriate sportspeople in Qatar
Romanian expatriate sportspeople in the United Arab Emirates
Romanian expatriate sportspeople in China
Expatriate football managers in Saudi Arabia
Expatriate football managers in Qatar
Expatriate football managers in the United Arab Emirates
Expatriate football managers in China